Edwin J. McDonough (c. 1943 – February 9, 2016) was an American theater and screen actor. His film and television credits included Reversal of Fortune in 1990 and Kinsey in 2004. He appeared in eight Broadway productions during his career, notably the 1974 revival of A Moon for the Misbegotten, as well as regional theater productions throughout the United States.

Early life and education 
Born in Milton, Massachusetts, McDonough graduated from Boston College High School. He then enrolled at Boston College, where he completed two degrees in English literature. He relocated to Manhattan in 1969, where he enrolled in a doctoral program at New York University. He later completed his doctoral thesis, "Quintero Directs O'Neill."

Career 
McDonough enlisted in the United States Army, where he served for two years at the National Security Agency (NSA) as a Middle East analyst.

McDonough commuted from Boston to New York City for 45 years to pursue theater, film and television. He was cast in eight Broadway productions and worked in regional theater nationwide. In addition to film and theater, his television credits included guest roles in Law & Order, Sex and the City and Ed. He later moved to Needham, Massachusetts.

Personal life 
Edwin McDonough died at his home in Needham, Massachusetts, on February 9, 2016, at the age of 72. He was survived by his wife, Patricia Shannon McNally, three stepchildren, Michael McNally, Lee McNally, and Katherine McNally, and four grandchildren. He was buried at St. Mary Cemetery in Needham.

Filmography

Film

Television

References

External links

1943 births
2016 deaths
American male film actors
American male stage actors
American male television actors
Morrissey College of Arts & Sciences alumni
New York University alumni
People from Needham, Massachusetts
Boston College High School alumni